Niall J. Mellon (born 1967) is an Irish entrepreneur,  charity Chief Executive and property developer  who founded the Niall Mellon Township Trust to provide homes to impoverished communities in South Africa's townships.

Early life and career
Mellon grew up in Ballyroan, County Dublin. After finishing school, Mellon joined his father's personalised investment brokerage.

At age 24, he set up his own mortgage company, and subsequently grew his property and financial services interests through the Niall J. Mellon Group. He carried out several highly successful  development projects in Great Britain and in Ireland and acquired numerous properties through his primary investment and syndicate vehicle Earthquake Property Partners. He was affected by the post-2008 Irish banking crisis, losing the bulk of his wealth.

Philanthropy
In 2002, aged 35, Mellon began to spend most of his time working to help the poor. While on a visit to South Africa, he was moved by the poverty of some township communities near Cape Town, and subsequently formed the house building charity, the "Niall Mellon Township Trust", primarily with his own funds. In 2013 Mellon Educate was established with the goal of building and refurbishing schools in South Africa and Kenya.

As of March 2014 the charity had built about 22,000 houses for 120,000 South Africans.

Honours and awards 
In 2005, Mellon was awarded an honorary doctorate from the Dublin Institute of Technology and in 2008, an honorary doctorate in law from University College Cork.

References

1967 births
20th-century Irish businesspeople
21st-century Irish businesspeople
Living people
Businesspeople from County Dublin
Ireland–South Africa relations
Irish humanitarians
21st-century Irish philanthropists
Date of birth missing (living people)